

The Turtmannsee is a reservoir located south of Gruben/Meiden at the foot of the Turtmann Glacier, in the Swiss canton of Valais. The lake has a surface area of 0.092 km² and is located at 2,177 metres above sea level. It is split between the municipalities of Oberems (west) and Turtmann-Unterems (east). Just above the Turtmannsee lies a smaller reservoir.

See also
List of mountain lakes of Switzerland

References

Lakes of Valais
Lakes of Switzerland